Sergei Ivanovich Safronov (25 March 1930 – 1 May 1960) was a senior lieutenant in the Soviet Air Defense Forces. Safronov, a fighter pilot, was shot down by a friendly surface-to-air missile while attempting to intercept Gary Powers' U-2, conducting a reconnaissance mission.

Biography 
Safronov was born on 25 March 1930 in Gus-Khrustalny and graduated from the town's School No. 1 (later School No. 12) in 1948. He joined the Soviet Air Forces and graduated from the Borisoglebsk Military Aviation School of Pilots, serving with the 764th Fighter Aviation Regiment of the Soviet Air Defence Forces at Bolshoye Savino Airport from 1952.

In the 1960 U-2 incident he and his flight leader, deputy squadron commander Captain Boris Ayvazyan were vectored to intercept Gary Powers' U-2 with their MiG-19 fighters. On their way to interception, the U-2 was shot down by S-75 Dvina surface-to-air missiles, but large pieces of the downed aircraft made it look like its flight was continuing, so additional S-75 missiles were fired. However, the MiGs' IFF transponders were not yet switched to the new May codes because of the 1 May holiday and consequently, Safronov's plane was identified as a foe by the missile operators and another salvo was launched. His aircraft took a direct hit from one of the S-75 missiles intended for the U-2 and was destroyed. He was able to eject, but died from his injuries; Powers saw a parachute open after leaving the U-2. Safronov was buried at the Yegoshikha Cemetery in Perm.

The decree published by newspapers in the Soviet Union presented Safronov the Order of the Red Banner along with Major Mikhail Voronov and Captain Nikolai Sheludko (the commanders of the two missile batteries which had engaged the U-2). The decree did not mention that Sergei Safronov died and several subsequent publications did not state that he died. His death was not revealed until thirty years later during Glasnost with the publication of several news articles.

Personal life 
He married Anna Vasilievna Panfilova, a high school classmate, and had a son, Alexander Sergeievich. Years after Safronov's death, his wife married Ayvazyan.

Legacy 
Safronov was posthumously made an honorary citizen of the town of Degtyarsk, over which the incident took place. A monument to Safronov was built in the town's park. On 1 May 2007, the 47th anniversary of Safronov's death, a memorial stele was dedicated at the 764th Regiment's airfield. Three years later, on the 50th anniversary of his death, a Mikoyan MiG-31 fighter stationed at Bolshoye Savino was named for Safronov.

References

Notes

Bibliography 
 
 
 

1930 births
1960 deaths
Aviators killed by being shot down
Military personnel killed by friendly fire
Soviet Air Force officers
Recipients of the Order of the Red Banner
People from Gus-Khrustalny
Soviet Air Defence Force officers
Soviet military personnel killed in action